Barangay health volunteers, also known as barangay health workers, are health care providers in the Philippines. They undergo a basic training program under an accredited government or non-government organization, and render primary care services in the community. They provide services such as first aid, maternal, neonatal, and child health, and community-based interventions including immunization clinics for barangays.

History 
With the decentralization of healthcare through the 1991 Local Government Code, the responsibility of delivery of primary health services were transferred from the central government to locally elected provincial, city, and municipal governments. Health services were previously funded and managed by the Department of Health but were transferred to the local governments after the devolution of the healthcare system.

Training and practice
Barangay Health Workers are accredited to function as such by the local health board in accordance with the guidelines promulgated by the Philippines Department of Health, as defined in Sec. 3 of Republic Act No. 7883. This act, also known as "Barangay Health Workers' Benefits and Incentives Act of 1995", recognizes the need for primary health care and organizes health workers to promote health empowerment.

Barangay health workers are a type of community health workers and act as health advocates and educators within their communities. They live in the communities they serve and receive about five weeks of training, ranging from administering immunizations, weighing children, birthing services, etc. They provide information, education and motivation services for primary health care, maternal and child health, child rights, family planning and nutrition.

On average, each Volunteer is expected to work with around 20 families in their community. However the scarcity of trained individuals has narrowed down the number of volunteers, especially in some remote areas, where now one or two volunteers service an entire barangay.

Research 

Research by Fe Espino at the Research Institute for Tropical Medicine on dengue prevention in the Philippines shows how community trust of the BHV is vital to the success of behavior change programs. In 2010, the number of dengue cases in the Philippines rose from 37,101 in 2006 to 118,868. Dengue fever is caused by a virus transmitted by mosquitoes which are born in still water. Due to water shortages, households are forced to store water throughout the year. Espino’s research team engaged the local Barangay Health Workers (BHWs) to introduce a household water container management system to control dengue in 2 communities in "Masagana City" in Metro Manila.

In both village ‘A’ and ‘B’, BHWs were trained to teach households to inspect water containers for immature mosquitoes. An instructional guide was provided along with a container management checklist, collected during monthly visits. The team also provided a video of dengue control techniques. Village A, however, encountered many problems and there was a poor response to the program. In Village B participants reported not only that the visits made residents more aware of dengue control, but they were more inclined to take action. Although behaviour change results have not yet been reported, it appears the difference is that the BHWs in Village B were more active and more trusted by the community. This shows that when engaging change agents, it’s important to understand both how the community feels about them and how they feel about their community.

Limitations 
Despite the efforts of barangay health volunteers, they are constrained within the political leadership of local government units. There is a perception that barangay health stations provide low-quality health services and have low-client satisfaction. With funding limitations, barangay health stations struggle with lack of medicines supplies, long wait times, declines in quality of facility infrastructure, and lack of proper training and staffing. The rural poor are the most susceptible to poor sanitation, malnutrition, and lack of hygiene efforts.  These communities that depend heavily on barangay health services are affected by political, social, and economic decisions made by local authorities .

Volunteers may often be limited in knowledge due to new advances in medicine and lack of proper training. Training is crucial for barangay health workers to improve their health knowledge and competency and provide the best quality care.

See also
Community health workers
Health in the Philippines 
The World Is Flat (book on globalization)

References

Barangays of the Philippines
Medical and health organizations based in the Philippines